Music Hath Charms is a 1935 British musical comedy film directed by Thomas Bentley, Walter Summers, Arthur B. Woods and Alexander Esway. It stars Henry Hall with the BBC Dance Orchestra, Carol Goodner and Arthur Margetson. It was given a trade show in October 1935 and went on full release in March the following year.

Musical numbers
 "Music Hath Charms"—the theme tune is performed twice, first with Dan Donovan on vocals at the beginning of the film, and later at the end with a harmony quartet and mixed chorus.
 "I'm Feeling Happy"—performed when Henry Hall goes to the recording studio. Dan Donovan provides the vocals.
 "There Is No Time Like the Present"—performed at a rehearsal.
 "Honey-Coloured Moon"—performed with vocals by Hildegarde.
 "Many Happy Returns Of The Day"—performed during a montage of Henry Hall's "birthday parade", after which the band-members go missing. This song should not be confused with the Burke-Dubin song of the same name, published in 1931.
 "Just Little Bits and Pieces"—the orchestra is still missing by 5.15, so Henry begins the programme with a piano improvisation, during which his musicians appear one by one.
 "(Serenading A) Big Ship"—featuring Dan Donovan on vocals, the action turns to an African outpost, where a man (probably the Governor) is too distracted by the music to defend himself from an incoming horde of cannibals.

Cast
 Henry Hall - Himself 
 W.H. Berry - Basil Turner 
 Carol Goodner - Mrs. Norbray 
 Arthur Margetson - Alan Sterling 
 Lorna Hubbard - Marjorie Turner 
 Antoinette Cellier - Joan 
 Billy Milton - Jack Lawton 
 Aubrey Mallalieu - Judge 
 Wallace Douglas - George Sheridan 
 Edith Sharpe - Miss Wilkinson 
 Gus McNaughton - Goodwin 
 Hugh Dempster - Tony Blower
 Cyril Smith as BBC Producer

See also
Music Hath Harms, 1929 American comedy film
The Melancholy Dame

References

External links

1935 films
Films shot at British International Pictures Studios
1930s English-language films
Films directed by Thomas Bentley
Films directed by Walter Summers
Films directed by Arthur B. Woods
1935 musical comedy films
British musical comedy films
Films set in London
British black-and-white films
Films scored by Benjamin Frankel
1930s British films